Anah is a district in Al Anbar Governorate, Iraq.  It is centred on the town of Anah. As of 2018, it has an estimated population of 31,575.

Cities
 Anah
 Al Rihanih

References

Districts of Al Anbar Governorate